Kusanagi Station (草薙駅) is the name of two train stations in Japan:

 Kusanagi Station (JR Central)
 Kusanagi Station (Shizuoka Railway)